Newes from Scotland - declaring the damnable life and death of Dr. Fian, a notable sorcerer is a pamphlet printed in London in 1591, and likely written by James Carmichael, who later advised King James VI on the writing of his book Daemonologie. It describes the North Berwick witch trials in Scotland and the confessions given before the king, and was published in Daemonologie by King James in 1597.

Content

Included in the pamphlet is an account of the alleged witches Agnes Sampson, known as the Wise Wife of Keith, and the principal accuser Geillis Duncan. It also described the death of Archibald Douglas, 8th Earl of Angus who was said to have been bewitched to death in a disease so strange his physician could find no cure or remedy. The pamphlet details the initial events leading up to the trials, how each of the suspected witches were found out and captured. This led to the eventual apprehension of Dr. John Fian who was declared a notable sorcerer, under compact with the devil and the supposed head of the coven.

During his examination, he confessed to be the register of the witches under the service of Satan. Afterwards, he renounced his compact with Satan and swore to live an honourable Christian life. He also testified that Satan came to him the same day to convince him to uphold his original pact. Fian stated that he renounced Satan to his face.

It was the next day when he confessed what happened that he managed to steal a key to his cell from one of the guards and escaped his imprisonment. After he was recaptured, he was tortured to obtain his confession but denied all his previous confessions. Implements described as used during his interrogation included the boot, which crushed his feet and lower legs, with turcas, a type of pincer, and needles to forcibly extract his nails. Geillis Duncan's earlier testimony had been secured by the use of pilliwinks.

Historical significance
The pamphlet contains virtually the only contemporary illustrations of Scottish witchcraft and was the earliest Scottish or English printed document dedicated to only covering witchcraft in Scotland. It provided the first descriptions of the osculum infame, also known as the kiss of shame or the obscene kiss, to the English population.

Original copies are kept at Glasgow University, and in the Bodleian Library at Oxford.

References

Notes

Citations

Bibliography

External links
 Digitization of an 1816 facsimile reprint of the pamphlet from the British Library

1591 books
16th century in Scotland
Books about Scotland
Occult books
Pamphlets
Scottish non-fiction literature
Witch hunter manuals
Witchcraft treatises
Witchcraft in Scotland
Works by James VI and I